There have been a number of Reciprocity Treaties, including:

the Canadian–American Reciprocity Treaty of 1854
the Reciprocity Treaty of 1875 between the United States and the Hawaiian Kingdom
the Inter-American Treaty of Reciprocal Assistance of 1947 (also known as the Rio Treaty)

See also;
 Reciprocity (international relations)